The Sydney trolleybus system in New South Wales consisted of two unconnected lines in the Eastern Suburbs and St George areas of Sydney.

History

The first of these opened on 22 January 1934 when route 3 from Wylde Street, Potts Point to Town Hall station via Kings Cross and William Street. The route was temporarily converted to motor bus operation on 11 April 1948 while Liverpool Street was rebuilt. It was later decided not to reinstate the service.

On 3 July 1937, the second line opened from Rockdale station to Sans Souci via Kogarah station, Rocky Point Road and Dolls Point replacing the Kogarah to Sans Souci steam tramway. It closed on 29 August 1959.

Services
Sydney's trolleybus routes were as follows:

Fleet
For the commencement of operations in the Eastern Suburbs, two single deck three-axle AEC 663Ts were purchased. One was bodied by Park Royal, London and the other by H McKenzie of White Bay. They were later joined by three AEC 761T double deck vehicles, one bodied by Park Royal and two locally by Syd Wood. For the commencement of the Kogarah services, 11 Leyland TTB4 and 10 AEC 664T double deck three-axle buses were bodied by Ritchie Brothers, Auburn. After the Eastern Suburbs line, the four surviving buses were transferred to Sans-Souci.

Depots
The Eastern Suburbs buses were based at Rushcutters Bay Tram Depot with a turntable installed. The Kogarah services were based at the former Ritchie Street tram depot in Sans Souci. After the trolleybuses ceased in 1959, it was used by the New South Wales Police as a storage area for recovered stolen vehicles before passing to the Housing Commission.

Legacy
The Powerhouse Museum has AEC 663T trolleybus number 1 in its collection while the Sydney Tramway Museum has AEC 664T number 19.

References

Further reading

External links

Flickriver Photoset: Sydney Trolley Buses – colour images, particularly of the Kogarah system

Bus transport in Sydney
Sydney
Sydney
1934 establishments in Australia
1959 disestablishments in Australia